The Minnehaha was a barque built in 1857 and wrecked on 18 January 1874 in the Isles of Scilly.

Wreck

On 18 January 1874, while travelling from Callao, Peru to Dublin, the 845-ton barque Minnehaha carrying guano was wrecked off Peninnis Head, St Mary's, Isles of Scilly. Her pilot mistook the St Agnes light for the Wolf Rock and thought they were passing between the Isles of Scilly and the Wolf. Shortly after she struck a rock off Peninnis Head and the vessel sunk at once with some of the crew being drowned in their berths. Those on deck climbed into the rigging, and as the tide rose the ship was driven closer to land, and some managed to climb onto the shore over the jibboom. The master, pilot and eight crew drowned.

See also

 SS Minnehaha – wrecked in the Isles of Scilly on 18 April 1910
 List of shipwrecks of the Isles of Scilly

References

External links
 Diving the South Coast of England (archived) - Cornwall Dive Sites
 Photographic archive: ‘The Gibson archive’ at the Royal Museums Greenwich (RMG) 

1857 ships
Maritime incidents in January 1874
Shipwrecks of the Isles of Scilly